The 22685 / 22686 Yesvantpur–Chandigarh Karnataka Sampark Kranti Express is an express train belonging to South Western Railway zone that runs between  and  in India. It is currently being operated with 22686/22685 train numbers on a bi-weekly basis.

Service

The 22685/Yesvantpur–Chandigarh Karnataka Sampark Kranti Express has an average speed of 54 km/hr and covers 2865 km in 52h 35m.
The 22685/Yesvantpur–Chandigarh Karnataka Sampark Kranti Express has an average speed of 56 km/hr and covers 2865 km in 50h 55m.

Route & Halts 

The important halts of the train are:

Coach composition

The train has standard ICF rakes with a max speed of 110 kmph. The train consists of 23 coaches:

 1 First AC
 2 AC II Tier
 5 AC III Tier
 08 Sleeper coaches
 1 Pantry car
 2 General Unreserved
 2 High Capacity Parcel Van
 2 Seating cum Luggage Rake

Traction

Both trains are hauled by a Krishnarajapuram based WDP-4D / WDP-4B diesel locomotive from Bengaluru to Pune. From Pune, train is hauled by a Ghaziabad based WAP-7 electric locomotive from New Delhi and vice versa.

Rake sharing

The train shares its rake with 16541/16542 Yesvantpur–Pandharpur Express.

Direction reversal

The train reverses its direction 2 times:

See also 

 Chandigarh Junction railway station
 Yesvantpur Junction railway station
 Karnataka Sampark Kranti Express
 Karnataka Sampark Kranti Express (via Hubballi)

Notes

References

External links 

 22685/Yesvantpur–Chandigarh Karnataka Sampark Kranti Express India Rail Info
 22686/Chandigarh–Yesvantpur Karnataka Sampark Kranti Express India Rail Info

Rail transport in Bangalore
Sampark Kranti Express trains
Rail transport in Karnataka
Rail transport in Uttar Pradesh
Rail transport in Madhya Pradesh
Rail transport in Haryana
Rail transport in Maharashtra
Rail transport in Delhi
Rail transport in Chandigarh
Railway services introduced in 2016